"Nobody to Blame" is a song recorded by American singer-songwriter Chris Stapleton. The song was released in November 2015 as the singer's third single overall. Stapleton co-wrote the song with Barry Bales and Ronnie Bowman. It became Stapleton's first top 10 single on the US Country Airplay chart. "Nobody to Blame" won Song of the Year at the ACM Awards.

Content
The country rock song is a mid-tempo composition about a man looking back on the events following a break-up. His ex has kicked him out of the house and destroyed all of his belongings, often in sadistic fashion (dumping out his whiskey, breaking his fishing rods, burning his guitar in a bonfire, running his hot rod car into a pond and putting sugar in the gas tank of his lawnmower). Despite her behavior, he admits there is "nobody to blame" but himself for his situation.

Critical reception
Billy Dukes of Taste of Country gave the song a favorable review, saying that it "is a 200-proof country song that'd fit neatly into any generation's best of catalog. The second single from Traveller is full of steel guitar, fiddle and pain. It rambles along like the best from Waylon while providing a de facto education to the 21st century boy. Stapleton doesn't deviate from what he does best: simple, honest story songs that lean heavy on his once-in-a-lifetime voice."

Commercial performance
The song first entered the Country Airplay chart at number 46 and the Hot Country Songs chart at number 50 for the chart dated November 21, 2015. The song peaked at number 10 on the Country Airplay chart, making it Stapleton's first single to reach the top 10. It has sold 423,000 copies in the US as of November 2016.

Charts

Weekly charts

Year end charts

Certifications

References

2015 songs
2015 singles
Chris Stapleton songs
Mercury Nashville singles
Songs written by Ronnie Bowman
Songs written by Chris Stapleton
Song recordings produced by Dave Cobb
Country rock songs